Josua "Josh" Koroibulu is a Fijian professional rugby league footballer who has played for the Milton-Ulladulla Bulldogs, the Guyra Super Spuds and the Armidale Rams RLFC (of Group 19 Rugby League, in Armidale, New South Wales). In 2008 he was named rookie of the year by the Fiji National Rugby League. He was selected for Fiji squad in the 2008 Rugby League World Cup, but he did not play in any of Fiji's four matches.

In March 2010 he was selected for the Gympie Devils.

References

1982 births
Living people
Fiji national rugby league team players
Fijian rugby league players
Rugby articles needing expert attention
Rugby league props
Rugby league second-rows